Devils is a financial thriller drama television series created by Alessandro Sermoneta, Mario Ruggeri, Elena Bucaccio, Daniele Cesarano, Barbara Petronio, and Ezio Abbate for  and Sky Italy. It is based on the 2014 novel of the same title by Brera. Devils is a Lux Vide and Sky Italy production in association with Orange Studio and OCS.
 
The series premiered on 17 April 2020 on Sky Atlantic in Italy. Ahead of its premiere, the series was renewed for a second season.

Plot
London, 2011. Italian trader Massimo Ruggero is the Head of Trading at the New York London Investment Bank (NYL). While the financial crisis is raging in Europe, Massimo is making hundreds of millions for NYL out of speculation.

As his mentor Dominic Morgan, the American CEO of NYL and the nearest to a father that Massimo has ever had, fully supports him, the talented trader seems to be the first choice in the run for vice-CEO. However, when Massimo is involved in a painful scandal that sees his estranged wife playing an escort, Dominic denies him the promotion, choosing the old-school banker Edward Stuart instead.

Massimo is left astounded – his mentor turned his back on him. Convinced that the scandal was a set-up, Massimo is determined to seek the truth but when Edward suddenly dies, Massimo realizes that something bigger is at stake.

With the help of his trading team and a group of hacktivists, Massimo will discover the hidden agenda behind apparently unrelated events, such as the Strauss-Kahn scandal, the Libyan Civil War, and the crisis of the PIIGS.

Facing the devils who pull the strings of the world, Massimo will have to choose whether to fight them or to join them.

Cast and characters

Main
Alessandro Borghi as Massimo Ruggero
Laia Costa as Sofia Flores
Kasia Smutniak as Nina Morgan
Malachi Kirby as Oliver Harris
Lars Mikkelsen as Daniel Duval
Pia Mechler as Eleanor Bourg
Paul Chowdhry as Kalim Chowdrey
Sallie Harmsen as Carrie Price
Harry Michell as Paul McGuinnan
Patrick Dempsey as Dominic Morgan

Recurring
Ben Miles as Edward Stuart
Nathalie Rapti Gomez as Kate Baker
Jemma Powell as Claire Stuart
Lorna Brown as Vicky Bale
Maximilian Dirr as Karl Haufman
Tom McKay as Chris Bailey 
Anthony Souter as BBC reporter
Chris Reilly as Alex Vance
Christina Andrea Rosamilia as a transgender person

Episodes

Series overview

Series 1 (2020)

Series 2 (2022)

Distribution
The series premiered on 17 April 2020 on Sky Atlantic in Italy, 18 April 2020 on OCS in France, 16 September 2020 on W Network in Canada,
and 7 October 2020 on The CW in the United States.

Notes

References

External links
 

2020 Italian television series debuts
2020s Italian drama television series
English-language television shows
Financial thrillers
Sky Atlantic (Italy) television programmes
Television shows based on Italian novels
Television shows set in Italy
Television shows set in London